Dry states may designate:

 Dry states, in the history of the United States of America, especially during the Prohibition from 1920 to 1933.
 Dry states in India, where alcohol drinking is prohibited (such as Mizoram or Nagaland).